There have been two Montenegrin independence referendums:

1992 Montenegrin independence referendum, when Montenegro remained within Yugoslavia
2006 Montenegrin independence referendum, when Montenegro succeeded from Serbia and Montenegro